"One Whole Day" is a song by American social media personality Dixie D'Amelio featuring rapper Wiz Khalifa. The song and music video were released on December 4, 2020. It was produced by Andrew Goldstein.

Background and composition 
The song and music video were released on December 4, 2020. The pop-trap song is about love, heartbreak, and triumphing after a breakup. D'Amelio did not confirm speculation that the song is about her breakup with social media personality Griffin Johnson. The music video features her boyfriend, Noah Beck, and her younger sister, Charli D'Amelio. The song and music video are noticeably darker than D'Amelio's debut single, "Be Happy" (2020).

Critical reception 
The song was met with negative reviews from music critics. The Dallas Observer wrote that "D'Amelio uses grating electronic beats and tired, kindergarten grade rhymes to sing about the same kind of angry heartbreak that's been sung about since the days of the Dust Bowl." It was included on a list of the worst songs of 2020 published by Insider, writing that it "sounds like a parody of a real song." It was additionally compared to Rebecca Black's "Friday"; however, the publication added that "except it's not nearly as catchy".

Credits and personnel 
Credits adapted from Tidal.

 Andrew Goldstein – producer, composer, bass, guitar, mixer, programming and keyboards
 Brooke Tomlinson – composer, vocals
 Lindy Robbins – composer
 Wiz Khalifa – composer, featured artist, 
 Cate Wright – A&R administration and direction, 
 Marie Lewis – A&R coordination
 Brian Gardner – mastering
 Mitch Allan – mixer, vocal production
 Caleb Hulin – vocal engineer

Charts

References

2020 singles
2020 songs
Dixie D'Amelio songs
Wiz Khalifa songs
Songs written by Andrew Goldstein (musician)
Songs written by Lindy Robbins
Songs written by Wiz Khalifa
Trap music songs